Tom Heckert (born September 18, 1938) is an American football former coach, scout, and executive.  He served as the head football coach at Adrian College from 1973 to 1981, compiling a record of 43–36–2.  Heckert was then a scout with the Cleveland Browns from 1982 to 1986 and a personnel executive with the Miami Dolphins from 1989 until his retirement in 2007.  His son, Tom Heckert Jr., was the former general manager of the Browns.

Head coaching record

Football

References

1938 births
Living people
Adrian Bulldogs baseball coaches
Adrian Bulldogs football coaches
Adrian Bulldogs men's basketball coaches
Cleveland Browns executives
Miami Dolphins scouts
Kent State University alumni 
Youngstown State University alumni